Conscious business enterprises and people are those that choose to follow a business strategy, in which they seek to benefit both human beings and the environment.

The conscious business movement in the US emerged from the theory of corporate social responsibility, which pushes for a "values-based" approach where values represent social and environmental concerns both locally and globally.  This effort is related to not-just-for-profit business models, conscious consumerism, socially responsible investing, and Conscious capitalism.

There is an alternative way of thinking about conscious business emerging in the UK, and perhaps other countries, which tries to avoid reification, regarding it less as a thing or a type of business which can be categorised, and more as an ongoing process including awareness, self-awareness, awareness of purpose, practice (social theory) and relationships.

In Italy, De Nardi Gianluca illustrates through the use of business cases how every company could adopt conscious business processes.

Conscious business criteria

Doing no harm
It is generally agreed upon that the product or service of a conscious business should not be intrinsically harmful to humans or the environment. However, it is possible for such a business to be taking part in the conscious business movement if it is taking conscious steps to be more aware of its social and environmental effects, and to adopt more beneficial social or environmental practices.

Triple Bottom Line Model
Most conscious businesses subscribe to a Triple Bottom Line model of success. They aim to provide positive value in the domains of people, planet, and profit. The phrase "Triple Bottom Line" was coined by business writer John Elkington in 1994.

Further reading
Abergene, Patricia;  Megatrends 2010: The Rise of Conscious Capitalism.  Hampton Roads Publishing Company (September 2005).
Burden, P and Warwick R; Leading Mindfully. Burden and Warwick (2015)
Dalai Lama and Cutler, H; The Art of Happiness at Work. Hodder and Stoughton (2003)
De Nardi, Gianluca; The business model of 'conscious companies' The EcorNaturaSì case"". Ca' Foscari University of Venice (2017)
Haque, Umair; Betterness: Economics for Humans. Harvard Business Review Press (December 19, 2011)
Hawken, Paul;  Natural Capitalism. Back Bay Books; 1st edition (October 12, 2000).
Kofman, Fred;  Conscious Business: How to Build Value Through Your Values.  Sounds True: September (2006).
Mackey, John; Sisodia, Rajendra; Conscious Capitalism: Liberating the Heroic Spirit of Business. Harvard Business Press (January 2013)  
McInnes, Will; Culture Shock. John Wiley & Sons (2012)
Price, John; The Conscious Investor. John Wiley & Sons (2011)
Renesch, John; Conscious Leadership. Brown & Herron (June 17, 2002)
Sisodia, Rajendra; Wolfe, David; Sheth, Jagdish; Firms of Endearment: How World-class Companies Profit from Passion and Purpose. Pearson Prentice Hall (February 10, 2007)
Sisodia, Rajendra; Gelb, Michael J.; The Healing Organization: Awakening the Conscience of Business to Help Save the World.'' HarperCollins Leadership (September 2019).
Stahlhofer, Nicolas; Schmidkonz, Christian; Kraft, Patricia "Conscious Business in Germany" Springer (December 2017)

See also 

B Corporation (certification)
Business ethics
False consciousness
Marketing
Cognitive dissonance
Sustainable business

References

Corporate social responsibility
Capitalism